Custódio Miguel Dias de Castro (born 24 May 1983), known simply as Custódio, is a Portuguese football coach and a former player who played as a defensive midfielder. He is the manager of Braga B.

Over 12 seasons, he amassed Primeira Liga totals of 209 matches and 12 goals, representing in the competition Sporting CP, Vitória de Guimarães and Braga. He reached the 2011 Europa League final with the latter club, and also competed professionally in Russia and Turkey.

Custódio was part of the Portugal squad at Euro 2012, earning a total of ten caps in one year.

Club career
Custódio was born in the village of Brito, Guimarães. From 2001 to 2007 he played for Sporting CP, making his Primeira Liga debut on 23 March 2002 in a 2–0 home win against S.C. Salgueiros; he finished the 2003–04 season with 27 league appearances.

In the 2006–07 campaign, coach Paulo Bento named Custódio captain in recognition of his history at Sporting and consistent displays in the previous seasons. Incidentally, in that timeframe, he also fell out of favour in the team's rotation and, in June 2007, was sold to Russian Premier League side FC Dynamo Moscow.

Custódio returned to Portugal in January 2009, re-joining childhood club Vitória de Guimarães along with Cícero Semedo. On 31 August of the following year, he moved to Minho neighbours S.C. Braga.

In his first season at the Estádio Municipal de Braga, Custódio battled for first-choice status with Brazilians Leandro Salino and Vandinho, but managed to appear in 21 competitive matches. On 5 February 2011 he scored from close range in a 2–1 away win against C.S. Marítimo, helping his team finish fourth in the league. On 5 May he netted arguably the most important goal of his career, heading from a corner kick for the game's only in a home victory over S.L. Benfica in the UEFA Europa League semi-finals second leg, with Braga qualifying for the final on the away goals rule.

Custódio spent the first half of 2011–12 on the sidelines, nursing a serious knee injury. When he returned to full fitness, however, he benefitted from Djamal Mahamat's presence in the 2012 Africa Cup of Nations and begun appearing regularly in the starting XI, scoring against Marítimo (2–1 away win) and former team Guimarães (4–0, at home).

In May 2017, after two and a half seasons in the Turkish Süper Lig with Akhisar Belediyespor, the 34-year-old Custódio retired and returned to Braga, being named assistant manager at the reserve side. On 3 March 2020, he left the under-17s and was appointed at the helm of the first team, replacing Sporting-bound Rúben Amorim. On his debut three days later, he managed a 3–1 home victory over Portimonense SC. 

Custódio resigned on 1 July 2020 with five games left of the season, having won two and lost three of his six fixtures. Two years later, he was put in charge of the reserves.

International career
A Portugal under-21 international, Custódio appeared in two UEFA European Championship editions, 2004 and 2006. He was selected by full side manager Paulo Bento for his 23-man squad for UEFA Euro 2012, and made his debut on 2 June, a 1–3 friendly loss with Turkey in Lisbon. In the finals in Poland and Ukraine, he played 20 minutes in the decisive 2–1 group stage defeat of the Netherlands after replacing injured Raul Meireles.

Career statistics

Club

International

Managerial statistics

Honours

Club
Sporting CP
Primeira Liga: 2001–02
Taça de Portugal: 2006–07
UEFA Cup runner-up: 2004–05

Braga
Taça da Liga: 2012–13
UEFA Europa League runner-up: 2010–11
Taça de Portugal runner-up: 2014–15

International
Portugal Under-16
UEFA European Under-16 Championship: 2000

Portugal Under-21
Toulon Tournament: 2003

References

External links

National team data 

1983 births
Living people
Sportspeople from Guimarães
Portuguese footballers
Association football midfielders
Primeira Liga players
Segunda Divisão players
Sporting CP B players
Sporting CP footballers
Vitória S.C. players
S.C. Braga players
Russian Premier League players
FC Dynamo Moscow players
Süper Lig players
Akhisarspor footballers
Portugal youth international footballers
Portugal under-21 international footballers
Portugal B international footballers
Portugal international footballers
UEFA Euro 2012 players
Portuguese expatriate footballers
Expatriate footballers in Russia
Expatriate footballers in Turkey
Portuguese expatriate sportspeople in Russia
Portuguese expatriate sportspeople in Turkey
Portuguese football managers
Primeira Liga managers
S.C. Braga managers